Presidential primaries and caucuses were organized by the Democratic Party to select the 3,979 pledged delegates to the 2020 Democratic National Convention held on August 17–20 to determine the party's nominee for president in the 2020 United States presidential election. The elections took place in all 50 U.S. states, the District of Columbia, five U.S. territories, and Democrats Abroad, and occurred between February 3 and August 11.

A total of 29 major candidates declared their candidacies for the primaries, the largest field of presidential primary candidates for any American political party since the modern primaries began in 1972, exceeding the field of 17 major candidates in the 2016 Republican Party presidential primaries. Former Vice President Joe Biden led polls throughout 2019, with the exception of a brief period in October when Senator Elizabeth Warren experienced a surge in support. 18 of the 29 declared candidates withdrew before the formal beginning of the primary due to low polling, fundraising, and media coverage. The first primary was marred by controversy, as technical issues with vote reporting resulted in a three-day delay in vote counting in the Iowa caucus, as well as subsequent recounts. The certified results of the caucus eventually showed Mayor Pete Buttigieg winning the most delegates, while Senator Bernie Sanders won the popular vote in the state. Sanders then went on to win the New Hampshire primary in a narrow victory over Buttigieg before handily winning the Nevada caucus, cementing his status as the front-runner for the nomination.

Biden, whose campaign fortunes had suffered from losses in Iowa, New Hampshire and Nevada, made a comeback by overwhelmingly winning the South Carolina primary, motivated by strong support from African American voters, an endorsement from South Carolina U.S. Representative Jim Clyburn, as well as Democratic establishment concerns about nominating Sanders. After Biden won South Carolina, and one day before the Super Tuesday primaries, several moderate candidates dropped out of the race and endorsed Biden in what was viewed as a consolidation of the party's moderate wing. Prior to the announcement, polling saw Sanders leading with a plurality in most Super Tuesday states. Biden then went on to win 10 out of 15 contests on Super Tuesday, beating back challenges from Sanders, Warren, and former New York City Mayor Michael Bloomberg, solidifying his lead.

On April 8, Biden became the presumptive nominee after Sanders, the only other candidate remaining, withdrew from the race. In early June, Biden passed the threshold of 1,991 delegates to win the nomination. In total, seven candidates received pledged delegates: Biden, Sanders, Warren, Bloomberg, Buttigieg, Senator Amy Klobuchar and U.S. Representative Tulsi Gabbard. On August 11, Biden announced that former presidential candidate Senator Kamala Harris would be his running mate. Biden and Harris were officially nominated for president and vice president by delegates at the Democratic National Convention on August 18 and 19. Biden and Harris went on to win the presidency and vice presidency in the general election on November 3, defeating the incumbents President Donald Trump and Vice President Mike Pence.

Biden became the first Democratic candidate since Bill Clinton, and the third ever Democratic candidate, to win the nomination without carrying either Iowa or New Hampshire, the first two states on the primary/caucus calendar.

The primaries were initially scheduled to go through June 6. However, the COVID-19 pandemic in the United States caused a number of states to shift their primaries to later in the year.

Background 
After Hillary Clinton's loss in the previous election, many felt the Democratic Party lacked a clear leading figure. Divisions remained in the party following the 2016 primaries, which pitted Clinton against Bernie Sanders. Between the 2016 election and the 2018 midterm elections, Senate Democrats generally shifted to the political left in relation to college tuition, healthcare, and immigration. The 2018 elections saw the Democratic Party regain the House of Representatives for the first time in eight years, picking up seats in both urban and suburban districts.

Reforms since 2016 

On August 25, 2018, the Democratic National Committee (DNC) members passed reforms to the Democratic Party's primary process in order to increase participation and ensure transparency. State parties are encouraged to use a government-run primary whenever available and increase the accessibility of their primary through same-day or automatic registration and same-day party switching. Caucuses are required to have absentee voting, or to otherwise allow those who cannot participate in person to be included.

Independent of the results of the primaries and caucuses, the Democratic Party, from its group of party leaders and elected officials, also appointed 771 unpledged delegates (superdelegates) to participate in its national convention.

In contrast to all previous election cycles since superdelegates were introduced in 1984, superdelegates will no longer have the right to cast decisive votes on the convention's first ballot for the presidential nomination. They will be allowed to cast non-decisive votes if a candidate has clinched the nomination before the first ballot, or decisive votes on subsequent ballots in a contested convention. In that case, the number of votes required shall increase to a majority of pledged and superdelegates combined. Superdelegates are not precluded from publicly endorsing a candidate before the convention.

There were also a number of changes to the process of nomination at the state level. A decline in the number of caucuses occurred after 2016, with Democrats in Colorado, Hawaii, Idaho, Kansas, Maine, Minnesota, Nebraska, North Dakota, and Washington all switching from various forms of caucuses to primaries (with Hawaii, Kansas, and North Dakota switching to party-run "firehouse primaries"). This has resulted in the lowest number of caucuses in the Democratic Party's recent history, with only three states (Iowa, Nevada, and Wyoming) and four territories (American Samoa, Guam, Northern Marianas, and U.S. Virgin Islands) using them. In addition, six states were approved in 2019 by the DNC to use ranked-choice voting in the primaries: Alaska, Hawaii, Kansas, and Wyoming for all voters; Iowa and Nevada for absentee voters. Rather than eliminating candidates until a single winner is chosen, voters' choices would be reallocated until all remaining candidates have at least 15%, the threshold to receive delegates to the convention.

Several states which did not use paper ballots widely in 2016 and 2018, adopted them for the 2020 primary and general elections,
to minimize potential interference in vote tallies, a concern raised by intelligence officials,
election officials
and the public.
The move to paper ballots enabled audits to start where they had not been possible before, and in 2020 about half the states audit samples of primary ballots to measure accuracy of the reported results.
Audits of caucus results depend on party rules, and the Iowa Democratic party investigated inaccuracies in precinct reports, resolved enough to be sure the delegate allocations were correct, and decided it did not have authority or time to correct all errors.

Rules for number of delegates

Number of pledged delegates per state 
The number of pledged delegates from each state is proportional to the state's share of the electoral college, and to the state's past Democratic votes for president. Thus less weight is given to swing states and Republican states, while more weight is given to strongly Democratic states, in choosing a nominee.

Six pledged delegates are assigned to each territory, 44 to Puerto Rico, and 12 to Democrats Abroad. Each jurisdiction can also earn bonus delegates by holding primaries after March or in clusters of 3 or more neighboring states.

Within states, a quarter of pledged delegates are allocated to candidates based on statewide vote totals, and the rest typically based on votes in each congressional district, although some states use divisions other than congressional districts. For example, Texas uses state Senate districts. Districts which have voted Democratic in the past get more delegates, and fewer delegates are allocated for swing districts and Republican districts. For example, House Speaker Pelosi's strongly Democratic district 12 has 7 delegates, or one per 109,000 people, and a swing district, CA-10, which became Democratic in 2018, has 4 delegates, or one per 190,000 people.

Candidate threshold 
Candidates who received under 15% of the votes in a state or district didn't get any delegates from that area. Candidates who got 15% or more of the votes divided delegates in proportion to their votes. These rules apply at the state level to state delegates and within each district for those delegates. The 15% threshold was established in 1992 to limit "fringe" candidates. The threshold now means that any sector of the party (moderate, progressive, etc.) which produces many candidates, thus dividing supporters' votes, may win few delegates, even if it wins a majority of votes.

Schedule and results

Election day postponements and cancellations

Due to the COVID-19 pandemic in the United States, a number of presidential primaries were rescheduled. On April 27, New York canceled its primary altogether on the grounds that there was only one candidate left with an active campaign. Andrew Yang responded with a lawsuit, arguing that the decision infringes on voting rights, and in early May, the judge ruled in favor of Yang.

In addition, the DNC elected to delay the 2020 Democratic National Convention from July 13–16 to August 17–20.

Candidates 

Major candidates in the 2020 Democratic presidential primaries had held significant elective office or received substantial media coverage.

Nearly 300 candidates who did not receive significant media coverage also filed with the Federal Election Commission to run for president in the primary.

Nominee

Withdrew during the primaries 

Other notable individuals who were not major candidates terminated their campaigns during the primaries:
 Henry Hewes, real estate developer; Right to Life nominee for Mayor of New York City in 1989 and U.S. Senate from New York in 1994
 Sam Sloan, chess player and publisher (Ran for Congress in NY-14)
 Robby Wells, former college football coach; Independent candidate for president in 2016

Withdrew before the primaries 

Other notable individuals who were not major candidates terminated their campaigns before the primaries:
 Ben Gleib, actor, comedian, satirist, and writer
 Ami Horowitz, conservative activist and documentary filmmaker (endorsed Donald Trump)
 Brian Moore, activist; Green nominee for U.S. Senate from Florida in 2006; Socialist and Liberty Union nominee for president in 2008
 Ken Nwadike Jr., documentary filmmaker, motivational speaker, and peace activist

Political positions

Debates and forums

Primary election polling

Timeline

Ballot access 
Filing for the primaries began in October 2019.  indicates that the candidate was on the ballot for the primary contest,  indicates that the candidate was a recognized write-in candidate, and  indicates that the candidate did not appear on the ballot in that state's contest.  indicates that a candidate withdrew before the election but was still listed on the ballot.

Candidates listed in italics have suspended their campaigns.

National convention 

The 2020 Democratic National Convention was scheduled to take place in Milwaukee, Wisconsin, on July 13–16, 2020, but was postponed and rescheduled to take place on August 17–20 due to the COVID-19 pandemic.

The event became a virtual "Convention Across America" with voting held online before the opening gavel, and the non-televised events held remotely over ZOOM.

Endorsements

Campaign finance 
This is an overview of the money being raised and spent by each campaign for the entire period running from January 1, 2017, to March 31, 2020, as it was reported to the Federal Election Commission (FEC). Total raised is the sum of all individual contributions (large and small), loans from the candidate, and transfers from other campaign committees. The last column, Cash On Hand (COH), has been calculated by subtracting the "spent" amount from the "raised" amount, thereby showing the remaining cash each campaign had available for its future spending  As of February 29, 2020, the major candidates have raised $989,234,992.08.

Maps

See also
 2020 United States presidential election

National Conventions
 2020 Democratic National Convention
 2020 Republican National Convention
 2020 Libertarian National Convention
 2020 Green National Convention
 2020 Constitution Party National Convention

Presidential primaries
 2020 Republican Party presidential primaries
 2020 Libertarian Party presidential primaries
 2020 Green Party presidential primaries
 2020 Constitution Party presidential primaries

Notes

References 

2019 in American politics
2020 elections in the United States
 
Political timelines of the 2020s by year
Democratic Party presidential primaries, 2020